Luisa Kiala (born 25 January 1982) is an Angolan handball player. She is a member of the Angola women's national handball team and participated at the 2011 and 2013 World Women's Handball Championships in Brazil and Serbia.

She competed at the 2004 Summer Olympics in Athens, where Angola placed 9th, at the 2008 Summer Olympics in Beijing, where Angola placed 12th, at the 2012 Summer Olympics, where Angola placed 10th and at the 2016 Summer Olympics, where Angola placed 8th. 

She is a sister to fellow handball player Marcelina Kiala and half-sister of Natália Bernardo.

References

External links

 

1982 births
Living people
Angolan female handball players
Olympic handball players of Angola
Handball players at the 2004 Summer Olympics
Handball players at the 2008 Summer Olympics
Handball players at the 2012 Summer Olympics
Handball players at the 2016 Summer Olympics
Handball players from Luanda
African Games gold medalists for Angola
African Games medalists in handball
Competitors at the 2011 All-Africa Games